Urkers is the local language of the municipality and former island of Urk, located on the west coast of the Dutch province of Flevoland. Urk was an island until the middle of the 20th century. It was originally located in the Zuiderzee, a bay of the North Sea, which became an inland sea called IJsselmeer when a dam was built to secure the Dutch coast against floods. Inhabitants of Urk had been mostly fishermen and still predominantly make their living from North Sea fishing.

Urkers is part of the dialect continuum that links Westphalian dialects in the North and East of Urk to the Lower Franconian dialects, mainly in the South, West, and North-West of Urk. Standard Dutch, and Afrikaans are also part of the Lower Franconian group. Urkers is considered a part of the Low Saxon group of languages despite the fact that it is quite extreme in that group and both geographically and linguistically at its edge.

Authors 
The author Gerrit Pasterkamp has written books in Urkers, including translations of the Jewish and Christian Psalms and belletristic works. 
There is at least one band, Leuster, that publishes some of their songs sung in Urkers on CD.

Documentation 
There is a crowdsourced online dictionary of Urkers and Dutch. The Urkers Dialect Circle has a small website collecting data on Urkers, including sample texts. See Websites, below.

Recognition 
Urkers is not recognized as a minority language by the Dutch government. A request to have an ISO 639-3 code assigned to Urkers was deferred due to incomplete treatment of the scope the rest of Low Saxon.

Sources

Literature 

External links 
 Urkers Dialekt Circle
 Online dictionary Urkers ↔ Dutch, having some 975 entries in July, 2022.

Languages of the Netherlands
Dutch Low Saxon
Westphalian dialects
Dutch dialects
Culture of Flevoland
Urk